Knyszyn-Cisówka  is a settlement in the administrative district of Gmina Knyszyn, within Mońki County, Podlaskie Voivodeship, in north-eastern Poland.

The settlement has a population of 20.

References

Villages in Mońki County